In September 2016, the International Union for Conservation of Nature (IUCN) listed 382 endangered reptile species. Of all evaluated reptile species, 7.4% are listed as endangered. 
The IUCN also lists nine reptile subspecies as endangered.

Of the subpopulations of reptiles evaluated by the IUCN, one species subpopulation has been assessed as endangered.

For a species to be considered endangered by the IUCN it must meet certain quantitative criteria which are designed to classify taxa facing "a very high risk of extinction". An even higher risk is faced by critically endangered species, which meet the quantitative criteria for endangered species. Critically endangered reptiles are listed separately. There are 578 reptile species which are endangered or critically endangered.

Additionally 910 reptile species (18% of those evaluated) are listed as data deficient, meaning there is insufficient information for a full assessment of conservation status. As these species typically have small distributions and/or populations, they are intrinsically likely to be threatened, according to the IUCN. While the category of data deficient indicates that no assessment of extinction risk has been made for the taxa, the IUCN notes that it may be appropriate to give them "the same degree of attention as threatened taxa, at least until their status can be assessed".

This is a complete list of endangered reptile species and subspecies evaluated by the IUCN. Species and subspecies which have endangered subpopulations (or stocks) are indicated.

Turtles and tortoises
There are 44 species, one subspecies, and one subpopulation of turtle assessed as endangered.

Cheloniids

Species
Green sea turtle (Chelonia mydas)
Subpopulations
Loggerhead sea turtle (Caretta caretta) (1 subpopulation)

Platysternidae
Big-headed turtle (Platysternon megacephalum)

Tortoises

Species

Subspecies
Western Hermann's tortoise (Testudo hermanni hermanni)

Geoemydids

Trionychids

Chelids

Emydids

Lizards
There are 241 species and seven subspecies of lizard assessed as endangered.

Iguanids

Species

Subspecies

Anguids

Diplodactylids

Chameleons

Anoles

Gekkonids

Wall lizards

Skinks

Species

Subspecies
Egernia stokesii badia
Eulamprus tympanum marnieae

Spectacled lizards

Sphaerodactylids

Phrynosomatids

Liolaemids

Other lizard species

Snakes
There are 97 species and one subspecies of snake assessed as endangered.

Pseudoxyrhophiids

Typhlopid blind snakes

Vipers

Species

Subspecies
Vipera ursinii rakosiensis

Dipsadids

Elapids

Colubrids

Keelbacks

Other snake species

See also 
 Lists of IUCN Red List endangered species
 List of least concern reptiles
 List of near threatened reptiles
 List of vulnerable reptiles
 List of critically endangered reptiles
 List of recently extinct reptiles
 List of data deficient reptiles

References 

Reptiles
Endangered reptiles
Endangered reptiles
Reptile conservation